Amycus is a mythical king of the Bebryces.

Amycus or Amykos may also refer to:

Greek mythology
 Amycus (centaur), a centaur who fought the Lapiths
 Amycus (mythology), various mythological figures with the name Amycus
 Amycos Satyrykos, a lost play by Sophocles

Other uses
 Amycus (Bithynia), a town on the Bosporus
 Amycus (spider), a genus of jumping spiders
 Amycus Carrow, a fictional character in the Harry Potter series
 USS Amycus (ARL-2), a ship of the US Navy during World War II